Elijah Hirsh (אלייז'ה הירש; born August 25, 1997) is an American-Israeli basketball player for Ironi Kiryat Ata in the Israeli Basketball Premier League.  He plays the forward position.

Biography

Hirsh was born in Woodstock, Georgia, to Michael and Jo Lynn Hirsh. He is 6' 8" (203 cm) tall, and weighed 220 pounds (100 kg).

He attended Woodstock High School and The King's Academy in Woodstock.

Hirsh then attended Berry College (Business Administration; '19). In 2018 he was named Southern Athletic Association All-Second Team and All-Tournament Team, First Team All-Conference, and broke the single-game record for blocks in Berry's NCAA DIII era with 10 blocks. In 2019 he averaged 17.5 points (second in the SAA), 9.2 rebounds (leading the SAA), and 1.9 blocks per game, and was named SAA Player of the Year, SAA All-First Team, and National Association of Basketball Coaches All-District South First Team, and Google Cloud Academic All-District.

He plays for Ironi Kiryat Ata in the Israeli Basketball Premier League, with whom Hirsh signed a two-year deal in July 2019.

References

External links
Berry Vikings bio
"Elijah Hirsh Berry College Senior Highlights: Class of 2019", video.

1997 births
Living people
American men's basketball players
Basketball players from Georgia (U.S. state)
Berry College alumni
College men's basketball players in the United States
Forwards (basketball)
Israeli American
Israeli men's basketball players
People from Woodstock, Georgia
Sportspeople from the Atlanta metropolitan area